Syzygium skiophilum (synonym Pseudoeugenia perakiana) is a species of plant in the family Myrtaceae. It is a tree native to Borneo, Peninsular Malaysia and Thailand.

References

skiophilum
Flora of Borneo
Flora of Peninsular Malaysia
Flora of Thailand
Trees of Peninsular Malaysia
Taxonomy articles created by Polbot
Taxobox binomials not recognized by IUCN